The 1897–98 Welsh Amateur Cup was the eighth season of the Welsh Amateur Cup. The cup was won by Rhos Eagle Wanderers who defeated Shrewsbury based team Singleton & Coles 6-1 in the final, at Chirk.

First round

Second round

Third round

Semi-final

Final

References

1897-98
Welsh Cup
1897–98 domestic association football cups